Alice Town is a town in the Bahamas. It is located on North Bimini island and the population is 300 as of the 2010 census.

Alice Town is the centre of the tourist trade on Bimini: there are several hotels, bars and restaurants. North of Alice Town is the main settlement (where most islanders live) called Bailey Town. To the north of Bailey Town is Porgy Bay.

Transportation
The town is served by South Bimini Airport on nearby South Bimini.

Gallery

References

External links
World Gazetteer

Populated places in the Bahamas
Bimini